Litargus is a genus of hairy fungus beetles in the family Mycetophagidae. There are at least 20 described species in Litargus.

Species
These 20 species belong to the genus Litargus:

 Litargus antennatus Miyatake, 1957
 Litargus asperulus Casey
 Litargus balteatus LeConte, 1856 (stored grain fungus beetle)
 Litargus coloratus Rosenhauer, 1856
 Litargus connexus (Geoffroy, 1785)
 Litargus didesmus (Say, 1826)
 Litargus grandis Schaeffer, 1910
 Litargus guadalupensis Grouvelle & Raffray, 1908
 Litargus infulatus LeConte, 1856
 Litargus lewisi Reitter, 1889
 Litargus longulus Casey
 Litargus nebulosus LeConte, 1856
 Litargus nitidus Brèthes
 Litargus pallens Casey
 Litargus pilosus Wollaston, 1857
 Litargus sexpunctatus (Say, 1826)
 Litargus sexsignatus Miyatake, 1957
 Litargus tetraspilotus LeConte, 1856
 Litargus transversus LeConte, 1856
 Litargus vestitus Sharp, 1879

References

Further reading

External links

 

Tenebrionoidea
Articles created by Qbugbot